This is an index of articles related to Africa, by country:

Index of Algeria-related articles
Index of Angola-related articles
Index of Benin-related articles
Index of Botswana-related articles
Index of Burkina Faso-related articles
Index of Burundi-related articles
Index of Cameroon-related articles
Index of Cape Verde–related articles
Index of Central African Republic-related articles
Index of Chad-related articles
Index of Comoros-related articles
Index of Democratic Republic of the Congo-related articles
Index of Republic of the Congo–related articles
Index of Djibouti-related articles
Index of Egypt-related articles
Index of Equatorial Guinea–related articles
Index of Eritrea-related articles
Index of Ethiopia-related articles
Index of Gabon-related articles
Index of Gambia-related articles
Index of Ghana-related articles
Index of Guinea-related articles
Index of Guinea-Bissau-related articles
Index of Ivory Coast-related articles
Index of Kenya-related articles
Index of Lesotho-related articles
Index of Liberia-related articles
Index of Libya-related articles
Index of Madagascar-related articles
Index of Mali-related articles
Index of Mauritania-related articles
Index of Mauritius-related articles
Index of Mayotte-related articles
Index of Morocco-related articles
Index of Mozambique-related articles
Index of Namibia-related articles
Index of Niger-related articles
Index of Nigeria-related articles
Index of Réunion-related articles
Index of Rwanda-related articles
Index of Saint Helena-related articles
Index of São Tomé and Príncipe-related articles
Index of Senegal-related articles
Index of Seychelles-related articles
Index of Somalia-related articles
Index of South Africa-related articles
Index of Sudan-related articles
Index of Tanzania-related articles
Index of Tunisia-related articles
Index of Uganda-related articles
Index of Western Sahara-related articles
Index of Zambia-related articles
Index of Zimbabwe-related articles

See also

Lists of country-related topics
Outline of Africa

Africa
i